Parryoceras is a cyrtogomphoceratid similar to Strandoceras but with broadly expanded siphuncle segments and a nearly straight ventral line. The mature shell is thickened on the inside just behind the aperture resulting in a constriction in the internal mold at the adoral end.

Parryoceras comes from the middle and upper Ordovician of arctic Canada and Norway.

References

Flower, Rousseau H. and Curt Teichert, 1957; The Cephalopod Order Discosorida, in University of Kansas Paleontological Contributions, Mollusca Article 6, pp 1–144 (plates, figs) July 1, 1957. 
Curt Teichert 1964. Nautiloidea-Discosorida; Treatise on Invertebrate Paleontology Part K, Endoceratoidea, Actinoceratoidea, Nautiloidea. Geological Society of America.

Discosorida
Prehistoric nautiloid genera
Middle Ordovician first appearances
Late Ordovician extinctions